The 1995 European Open Water Swimming Championships was the fourth edition of the European Open Water Swimming Championships (the first that was part of the 1995 European Aquatics Championships) and took part from 22–27 August 1995 in Vienna, Austria.

Results

Men

Women

Medal table

See also
 1995 European Aquatics Championships
 List of medalists at the European Open Water Swimming Championships

References

External links
 Ligue Européenne de Natation LEN Official Website

European Open Water Swimming Championships
European Open Water Championships